József Tihanyi (born 31 October 1946) is a Hungarian athlete. He competed in the men's high jump at the 1972 Summer Olympics.

References

External links
 

1946 births
Living people
Athletes (track and field) at the 1972 Summer Olympics
Hungarian male high jumpers
Olympic athletes of Hungary
People from Kaposvár
Sportspeople from Somogy County